Events from the year 1328 in Ireland.

Incumbent
Lord: Edward III

Births

Deaths
 Muiris Ó Gibealláin, Irish jurist, singer, philosopher, poet, and musician